Steven R. Schuh (born July 25, 1960 in Baltimore) is a former County Executive of Anne Arundel County, Maryland, and a former member of the Maryland House of Delegates, serving two terms in the Maryland General Assembly representing District 31 (Pasadena, Glen Burnie, Brooklyn Park, Severna Park, and Millersville). Schuh was elected County Executive in 2014 after defeating incumbent Laura Neuman in the Republican primary and defeating former three-term Sheriff George Johnson in the General Election. He is the ninth Anne Arundel County Executive. He was defeated in his bid for re-election in 2018 by Steuart Pittman.

Education
Schuh is a graduate of Severn School and grew up in Crofton, Maryland, in Anne Arundel County.  He holds a Bachelor of Arts degree in Economics and Political Science from Dartmouth College. Schuh holds two Master's degrees – a Master of Business Administration and a Master of Science in Education from Harvard University and Johns Hopkins University, respectively.  He is also a graduate of Leadership Anne Arundel's Flagship Program.

Career
Schuh has been in business for nearly thirty years.  He is President of Schuh Advisory, a private equity firm that specializes in starting new businesses. Previously, he was a Managing Director of Baltimore-based Alex. Brown & Sons, an investment banking and brokerage firm (and its successor entities), and a Managing Director of Credit Suisse, an international financial-services firm. Schuh was a senior partner in the corporate finance practices of both firms and is a nationally recognized expert in healthcare finance.

Community involvement
Schuh serves as Board Treasurer of the Baltimore Symphony Orchestra, a member of the Executive Committee of the United Way of Central Maryland and a member of the board of the R. Adams Cowley Shock Trauma Center at the University of Maryland Medical Center.  He served previously as Board Chairman of the American Red Cross of Central Maryland, a member of the Board of Severn School, Chairman of the Tocqueville Society of the United Way of Central Maryland, Board Chairman of Chesapeake Academy, a member of the Board of Directors of Chesapeake Arts Center and President of Eagle Cove School.

Legislative notes

Schuh was a member of the House Economic Matters Committee and the House Appropriations Committee (2007-2011) and serves as Chairman of the Anne Arundel County Delegation to the House of Delegates (2013-2014).

Taxes and fees 
Co-sponsored legislation lowering the cap on property tax assessments.
Co-sponsored "Taxpayer Bill of Rights" requiring that tax increases be subject to voter approval.
Sponsored legislation increasing the number of votes required to raise taxes to a three-fifths majority.
Voted against increases in the sales tax, cigarette tax, gas tax, hospital tax and Bay Restoration Fund fee.

Government reform 
Co-sponsored legislation requiring non-partisan redistricting of legislative districts.
Sponsored legislation requiring term limits for elected officials.
Sponsored legislation creating an elected school board in Anne Arundel County.

Public safety 
Sponsored "Jessica's Law 2010," tripling jail time for child sex offenders.
Voted against granting "good behavior" credits to sex offenders and parolees.

Education 
Co-sponsored legislation requiring that slots revenues be used to hire additional school resource officers.
Co-sponsored legislation creating a revolving loan fund for charter school construction projects.
Co-sponsored law expanding notification procedures for school officials when juveniles commit crimes.

Environment 
Voted to reduce emissions from coal-fired power plants.
Co-sponsored legislation temporarily exempting businesses relocating to Maryland from paying property taxes.
Co-Sponsored legislation establishing tax-free back-to-school shopping.
 Voted to require counties to repair failing storm pipes and restore eroded creeks.

Controversial positions
As County Executive, Schuh proposed prohibiting medical marijuana facilities contrary to the Maryland Attorney General's statement that counties cannot ban operations allowed by state law.
While County Executive, Schuh addressed students in a series of emails regarding teacher pay which were considered to be demeaning and condescending by students, and was called-out by many in local papers.

Election results 

2018 General Election for County Executive
{| class="wikitable"
|-
!Name !! Votes !! Percent !! Outcome
|-
| Steuart Pittman, Dem. || 118,572 || 52.3% || Won
|-
| Steve Schuh, Rep. || 107,905 || 47.6% || Lost
|-
| Other Write-Ins || 259 || 0.1% || Lost
|}
2018 Primary Election for County Executive
{| class="wikitable"
|-
!Name !! Votes !! Percent !! Outcome
|-
| Steve Schuh, Rep. || 23,874 || 100% || Won
|}
2014 General Election for County Executive
{| class="wikitable"
|-
! Candidate !! Votes !! Party !! Percentage
|-
| Schuh, Steve || 107,952 || Republican || 61.10%
|-
| Johnson, George IV || 68,379 || Democrat || 38.70%
|-
| Write-In || 340 ||  || .19%
|-
| Total || 176,671 ||  || 100%
|}
2014 Primary Election for County Executive
{| class="wikitable"
|-
! Candidate !! Votes !! Party !! Percentage
|-
| Schuh, Steve || 17,563 || Republican || 54.31%
|-
| Neuman, Laura || 14,776 || Republican || 45.69%
|-
| Total || 32,339 ||  || 100%
|}
2010 Race for Maryland House of Delegates – 31st District
Voters to choose three:
{| class="wikitable"
|-
!Name
!Votes
!Percent
!Outcome
|-
|-
|Nic Kipke, Rep.
|24,143
|  22.0%
|   Won
|-
|- 
|Steve Schuh, Rep.
|22,805
|  20.7%
|   Won
|-
|-
|Don H. Dwyer Jr., Rep.
|22,452
|  20.4%
|   Won
|-
|-
|Jeremiah Chiappelli, Dem.
|12,943
|  11.8%
|   Lost
|-
|-
|Justin M. Towles, Dem.
|11,968
|  10.9%
|   Lost
|-
|-
|Robert L. Eckert, Dem.
|11,856
|  10.8%
|   Lost
|-
|-
|Joshua Matthew Crandall, Lib.
|2,015
|  1.8%
|   Lost
|-
|-
|Cory Faust Sr., Con.
|1,660
|  1.5%
|   Lost
|-
|-Party shading/None
|Other Write-Ins
|105
|  0.1%
|   
|-
|}
2006 Race for Maryland House of Delegates – 31st District
Voters to choose three:
{| class="wikitable"
|-
!Name
!Votes
!Percent
!Outcome
|-
|- 
|Steve Schuh, Rep.
|19,049
|  18.4%
|   Won
|-
|-
|Nic Kipke, Rep.
|18,150
|  17.5%
|   Won
|-
|-
|Don H. Dwyer Jr., Rep.
|17,558
|  17.0%
|   Won
|-
|-
|Joan Cadden, Dem.
|17,533
|  16.9%
|   Lost
|-
|-
|Thomas J. Fleckenstein, Dem.
|16,654
|  16.1%
|   Lost
|-
|-
|Craig A. Reynolds, Dem.
|14,454
|  14.0%
|   Lost
|-
|-Party shading/None
|Other Write-Ins
|58
|  0.1%
|   
|-
|}

References and notes

External links
  (Defunct official website)
 

Living people
1960 births
Dartmouth College alumni
Harvard Business School alumni
Republican Party members of the Maryland House of Delegates
Politicians from Baltimore
People from Anne Arundel County, Maryland
21st-century American politicians